The Nationalisation process in Pakistan (or historically simply regarded as the "Nationalisation in Pakistan") was a policy measure programme in the economic history of Pakistan, made Pakistan's industrialization worst and lifted the trust of businessmen and investors. It first introduced, promulgated and implemented by  Zulfikar Ali Bhutto and Pakistan Peoples Party to lay the foundation of socialist economics reforms to improve the growth of national economy of Pakistan. Since the 1950s, the country had undergone a speedy industrialisation and became an industrial paradise in Asia. But, as time progressed, the labour trade unions and labour-working class had increasingly strained relations with the industrial business oligarch class, having neglected to improve working conditions and failing to provide a healthy and safe environment for the workers in these industrial industries.

The nationalisation programme began on 2 January 1972, with a vision to promote economic democracy, liberalisation, and an initial mainstream goal to put Pakistan in line with state progressivism. Ended effectively in 1977, the nationalisation programme was again put forward by Prime Minister Benazir Bhutto in 1996, and most recently by then-current Prime minister Yousaf Raza Gillani in 2012 who activated the programme to bring three major megacorporations (Steel Mills, Railways and International Airlines) under government ownership in an attempt to improve its structure and to alleviate its profitable process.

Despite its success in its formative years, such policy measure programmes met with an extreme level of spontaneous demonstration and international and national opposition that left disastrous effects on Pakistan's national economy and government takeover of private companies made Pakistan economy worst and investor's trust lost in Pakistan until it was replaced with the privatisation programme by later governments.

Nationalization phase (1971–1977)

Zulfikar Ali Bhutto (1928–1979) became President of Pakistan (1971–74) on 21 December 1971 after a disastrous end of 1971 war with India. The nationalisation programme was implemented for the first time in the history of Pakistan and it was promulgated through three different stages. On 1 January 1972, on a televised speech to the nation, Bhutto and the peoples party's government promulgated the three-staged programme, under "Nationalization and Economic Reforms Order (NERO)", which nationalised all major metal industries, including iron and steel, heavy engineering, heavy electricals, petrochemicals, cement and public utilities except textiles industry and lands. The first stage of the nationalisation programme integrated approximately 31 major industrial megacorporations, industrial units and enterprises, under direct management control of the government under 10 different categories of basic industries. The programme intended to assert public ownership over the industrial megacorporations, and to satisfied the labour unions to keep the industrialisation peace in the country.

Namely, the first stage of the nationalisation programme integrated the selective industries approved by the peoples party's government and the nationalisation programme provided the iron and steel, basic metal industries, heavy engineering industries, heavy electrical industries, assembly and manufacture of motor vehicles, tractor public utilities, including the electricity generation, transmission and distribution, gas and oil refineries, under the management of public sector.

A large number of Christian educational facilities were also nationalized in 1972. One example is Gordon College in Rawalpindi. In Peshawar nationalization of Christian schools happened under a later government. The provincial governor refused to implement Bhutto's policy. He did not want to disadvantage minorities in his province.

After the success of the first stage, the nationalisation programme stepped into the second stage when it was launched on 1 January 1974, intending to nationalised the banking and financial industry and sector in Pakistan. Passed by the parliament, over 13 major banks, over a dozen insurance companies, two petroleum companies and 10 shipping companies were forcefully nationalised. The second programme was presided by Finance Minister Mubashir Hassan who strongly maintained that: "wealth of the nation must be used for the benefit of the nation and can not be allowed to be concentrated in the banks of a few individuals."

On 1 April 1973, Bhutto held a meeting with members of Lahore Chamber of Commerce and Industry and maintained:

The third programme soon launched on 1 July 1976, when approximately 2,000 cotton, ginning and rice husking units came under the nationalisation programme. This programme met with administrative nightmare and widespread public resentment. The third programme eliminated the role of middle men, and it was rumoured that the producer as well as consumers of cotton, rice and wheat had been at the mercy of middle men trading in the milling of these commodities, with the result that producers were deprived of due share and consumer got poor quality and adulterated commodities at much higher prices. By 1977, the peoples party's government had built a strong and sizeable public sector with priority on cement, steel and fertilizers.

De-Nationalization phase (1988–present)

In November 1988, Benazir Bhutto and the Pakistan Peoples Party came to power for a second time. During the election campaign in 1988, Benazir Bhutto promised to the industrial sector to end nationalisation programme and to carry out the industrialisation by means other than state intervention.

But controversially, Benazir Bhutto did not authorise the directives to carry out the denationalisation programme or liberalisation of the national economy. No nationalised units were privatised, only few economic regulations were reviewed. Although limited-scale privatisation continued under Benazir Bhutto's second government, the UBL Pakistan and railway consortium was completely nationalised by Benazir Bhutto before being dismissed in 1996. During the second government, the Peoples Party intensified the government control on Pakistan Railways and Pakistan Steel Mills; all shares were kept under government management ownership. In 1998, Prime minister Nawaz Sharif  imposed economic emergency after performing nuclear deterrence in a direct response to India. All state-owned corporations and private sector industries' assets were frozen by Nawaz Sharif after ordering to freeze the private assets under government control to prevent the financial collapse. The foundation of nuclear program was laid by [(Zulfiqar Ali Bhutto)] in Pakistan

From 1999 to 2010, the nationalisation programme was swiftly ended and effectively came to its end until 2011. The nationalisation programme was again promulgated by Prime Minister Yousaf Raza Gillani on 15 December 2011, in order secure and rescue the former state-owned enterprises. The nationalisation programme was put forward to enhance the government ownership of Pakistan Steel Mills, Pakistan Railways as well as Pakistan International Airlines. The current nationalisation programme remains intact to restructured and made profitable while remaining within government ownership.

Opposition and adversaries 

The nationalisation policies had disastrous effects on the economy and had damaged the confidence of investors in the country. The nationalisation programme financially devastated 22 oligarch families, while one investor quoting: "industrialists not just lost industrial units to Bhutto's nationalization policy, they lost the urge to invest in Pakistan.". Major affectee included Nawaz Sharif who lost the major steel mill, the Ittefaq Group of Industries, and Chaudhry Shujaat Hussain's Gujrat Enterprises. All 25 shipping companies were merged with Pakistan National Shipping Corporation by Bhutto's nationalisation programme; those who protested were imprisoned by the government.

At an international level, the United States fully opposed the nationalisation programme and marked it as "ill-considered" decision of the government. Former prime minister Nawaz Sharif, an affectee of nationalisation process, gave vehement criticism and cited nationalisation programme as "lamentable state of Pakistan". While on the other hand, the unnamed and anonymous United States embassy officer later further noted that:

Responsive reasoning

The Pakistan Peoples Party's intellectuals on the other hand, vigorously defended the nationalisation programme. The Peoples Party maintained that the "nationalization" programme was indeed a "success" but the way it was implemented led to its failure. The Peoples' Party's members and cabinet officers, such as Dr. Mubashir Hassan, maintained that the Nationalization programme was party policy and the founding programme of the PPP in 1967, under "socialism is our economy" clause. Others supporting the arguments that the program was mandated by the people of Pakistan when they voted for PPP in 1970 general elections, and peoples party is proud of the successful implementation of the nationalisation policy, and the fact that nationalisation measures were protected for 10 years by the 1973 Constitution.

Started in 1970, the nationalisation programmes were precise articulation of that "self-consciousness" and "self-recognition" expression. The nationalisation programme completely abolished the monopoly and politicisation of economy under few hands that was kept in close drawing-room politics. The nationalisation program gave a though of "self-awareness" to labours, traders, and workers unions and to be more aware about the worker's rights and work healthy safe environment, as Suleman Akhtar maintained.

Government reports

See also
:Category:Government-owned companies of Pakistan
Privatization in Pakistan

References

Economic history of Pakistan
Government of Zulfikar Ali Bhutto
Pakistan People's Party
Government of Benazir Bhutto
Government of Yousaf Raza Gillani
Pakistan
Reform in Pakistan